is a railway station in the city of Nikkō, Tochigi, Japan, operated by the East Japan Railway Company (JR East).

Lines

Station layout
The station consists of two opposed side platforms, connected to the station building by a footbridge. The station has a Midori no Madoguchi staffed ticket office.

Platforms

History
Nikkō Station opened on 1 August 1890. With the privatization of Japanese National Railways (JNR) on 1 April 1987, the station came under the control of JR East.

Passenger statistics
In fiscal 2019, the station was used by an average of 1046 passengers daily (boarding passengers only).

Bus service

In front of Nikko Station Bus stop

Route Buses

Nikko Station Bus stop 
The bus stop is located on Japan National Route 119 between Nikko Station and Tobu-Nikko Station.

Route bus

Highway Bus

Surrounding area
 Tōbu Nikkō Station on the Tobu Nikko Line
 Nikkō City Hall
 Nikkō Post Office

See also
 List of railway stations in Japan

References

External links
 
 JR East station information 
Nikkō Tourist Association page about Nikkō Station

Railway stations in Tochigi Prefecture
Nikkō Line
Stations of East Japan Railway Company
Railway stations in Japan opened in 1890
Nikkō, Tochigi